Sir William Miller, 1st Baronet, of Manderston, Berwickshire (25 March 1809 – 10 October 1887) was a British Vice-Consul at Saint Petersburg in 1842–54, and a Member of Parliament for Leith Burghs in 1859–1868, for Berwickshire 1873/74, and an armiger.

Life
The son of James Miller (1775–1855) from Wick, by his spouse Elizabeth (d. 1862), daughter of Reverend William Sutherland, minister in Wick, he followed in his father's footsteps as a merchant trading in Imperial Russia. In an Ordinary of Scottish Arms (by Sir James Balfour Paul, Edinburgh 1903), the arms of William Miller, merchant, St.Petersburg (1853), were given as Argent, a cross moline azure square-pierced of the field within a bordure gules, on a chief of the last a garb between two mullets or.

Family
On 11 November 1858, Sir William Miller married Mary Anne, daughter of John Farley Leith, Member of Parliament for Aberdeen, and they had issue:

 Sir James Miller, 2nd Baronet of Manderston.
 Sir John Alexander Miller, 3rd Baronet of Manderston.
 Amy Elizabeth, who later inherited Manderston. She married, 1866, Major-General Thomas Manbourg Bailie, J.P. (1844 - 1918).
 Eveline (d.1946), married (1) 1866, Richard Hunter of Thurston, East Lothian (d. 1910); (2) 1919, Alfred Mitchell-Innes, of the Diplomatic Service (1864 -  1950).

References
 Burke's Peerage & Baronetage, 61st edition, London, 1899.

External links 
 

1809 births
1887 deaths
People from Berwickshire
British diplomats
Members of the Parliament of the United Kingdom for Edinburgh constituencies
Miller, Sir William, 1st Baronet
UK MPs 1859–1865
UK MPs 1865–1868
UK MPs 1868–1874
Scottish Liberal Party MPs